Noor Faezah Md Elai (better known by the name Faezah Elai) is a Malaysian actress.

Early life
She’s of Punjab and Thai descent. She came from Gelugor, Penang, and was born on August 16, 1982. She is also a former flight attendant of the Malaysian Aviation System (MAS).

Career
She started her early career as a model and joined Dewi Remaja 2005/2006. Where Scha Alyahya won the competition for that edition. Her first appearance in the film was through the film “Otai” directed by Abdul Razak Mohaideen in 2007. She later starred in the television drama series “Sutera Maya” which was broadcast on TV3 playing the role of Maya Sofea.
She started her acting work with the drama on the channel Astro Ria, Cinta dan Keadilsm.

Filmography

Film
Otai (2007) as Mawar
Anak Mamak Menantu Mami (2010)
Cun! (2011) as Kuntom/Tom
Senjakala (2011) as Isabella
Tolong Awek Aku Pontianak (2011)
Jidin Sengal (2012) as Ella Sunti
Mantera The Movie (2012)
Adik Manja Returns (2012) as Bib
KL Zombi (2013) as Sofea
Tanda Putera (2013) as Rahah Mohamed Noah

Telefilem
Dalca Mami Georgetown (2009)
Cinta Si Kasar Lembut (2011)
Ijam Non Yankee (2012)
Abah Tak Balik Malam Raya (2013)
Di Bawah Satu Langit (2013)
Dia Yang Terpilih (2013) as Mak Ngah
Miah Oh Miah
Anugerah Mimi
Di Mana Kan Ku cari Ganti
Pelita Tanpa Sumbu (2013)
Habibah VS Baby (2014)
Bila Tiba Saatnya (2016)
Sinar Ramadan Untuk Amanda (2019)

Drama
Cinta Dan Keadilan
Enigma (2008)
Sutera Maya (2008) sebagai Maya Sofea
Asmara as Zaliya
Cempaka Berbunga
Pemanduku Jutawan (2009)
Hartamas (2009)
La Dolce Amira (2009) as Amira
Cinta Sempurna (2009)
Gerak Khas (Musim 11) - episod: "Sindiket"
Sayang Cendana (2010) as Gina
Dendam Kesuma (2010)
Asmara 2 (2011) as Zaliya / Suhana
Jiwa & Lara (2011) as Marini
Memberku Hawa (Musim 1) (2012) as Hawa
Andai Kutahu (2012) as Shima/Shariza
7 Suami (2014) as herself
Kifarah: Di Angin Lalu (2014) as Zareen
Kifarah 2: Seri Muka (2014) as Nadia
Wadi (2015) as Cikgu Murni
Kifarah Mistik: Malam Jumaat (2015)
Nana Narita (2011)
Cerita Ramadan Hazim (2017)
Cinta Fatamorgana (2018) as Wahidah
Setelah Cinta Itu Pergi (2019) as Zaidah
Rumah Siti Khadijah (2019) as Amira

References

Living people
Malaysian actresses
Malaysian people of Punjabi descent
Malaysian people of Indian descent
Malaysian people of Malay descent
1982 births
Malaysian people of Thai descent
People from Penang